Kubaly may refer to:
Qubalı, Azerbaijan
Qubalıbalaoğlan, Azerbaijan